The Khushalgarh–Kohat–Thal Railway is one of several railway lines in Pakistan, operated and maintained by Pakistan Railways. The line originally ran from Golra Sharif Junction railway station to Khushalgarh station and onward to Thal station, however the line now ends at Kohat Cantonment station. There are 16 railway stations from Golra Sharif Junction to Thal. In 1991, the Kohat-Thal section was abandoned by Pakistan Railways.

History
The original line was a mixed gauge strategic military railway built in 1902 by the North Western State Railway. The Khushalgarh–Kohat section consisted of  broad gauge track while the Kohat–Thall section consisted of  narrow gauge track. Khushalgarh had been connected in 1881 by a short  broad gauge spur line to Jand Junction on the North Western State Railway mainline (now called the Kotri–Attock Railway Line). In April 1889, the Khushalgarh–Kohat section was first surveyed as a broad gauge line and in March 1901, a decision was made that no bridge would be built over the Indus river at Khushalgarh. Instead a ropeway would be built over the river and as a consequence, the broad gauge line idea was abandoned in favour of a 762mm narrow gauge line. In 1903, an accident closed the ropeway over the Indus river and a boat bridge replaced it. Eventually the decision was made to construct the Khushal Garh Bridge crossing the Indus river and at the same time converting the Khushalgarh–Kohat section from narrow gauge to broad gauge. This section was reopened in 1908. In 1947, the railway line was transferred to Pakistan Western Railways. In June 1991, the Kohat–Thal section was abandoned. In 2017, proposals were made to rebuild the Kohat–Thal section and upgrade the Khushalgarh–Kohat section. The Golra Sharif to Basal Junction section was built after.

Stations
Broad gauge section
 Golra Sharif
 Kutbal
 Fatehjang
 Gagan
 Chauntra
 Kahal
 Basal Junction
 Domel
 Nammal
 Chura Sharif Halt
 Langar
 Jand Junction
 Khushalgarh
 Faqir Hussain Shaheed
 Tilkan
 Seni Gambat
 Babari Banda
 Cadet College Kohat
 Kohat Cantonment
 Kohat Tehsil

Narrow gauge section
 Kohat Tehsil
 Nasrat Khel
 Chikarkot
 Ustarzai
 Raisan
 Ibrahimzai
 Hangu
 Doaba
 Togh
 Darsmand
 Thal

See also
Pakistan Railways

References

5 ft 6 in gauge railways in Pakistan
2 ft 6 in gauge railways in Pakistan